"Solo Conmigo" (English: "Only With Me") is a song by American singer Romeo Santos. It is the seventh single for Santos' fifth studio album Formula, Vol. 3 (2022). The music video was released on January 17, 2023. It features Santos' longtime girlfriend as she is seen pregnant in the video as they both announced that they are expecting another child. This means that Santos is expecting his fourth child.

Charts

References

2023 singles
2022 songs
Romeo Santos songs
Sony Music Latin singles
Songs written by Romeo Santos
Bachata songs
Spanish-language songs